Anterior interosseous may refer to:

 Anterior interosseous artery
 Anterior interosseous ligament
 Anterior interosseous nerve
 Anterior interosseous syndrome